Hanna María Karlsdóttir (born 19 November 1948) is an Icelandic actress. She is best known for her stage roles but also for her roles in Trapped and 101 Reykjavík.

Early life and education
Hanna graduated from the Icelandic Drama School in 1978.

Personal life 
Hanna grew up in Keflavík and played handball in her youth with ÍBK and was a member of Iceland's junior national teams. In 1967, she was selected to a 22-player training camp for the Icelandic handball team.

References

External links 
 

Living people
1948 births
Place of birth missing (living people)
Hanna Maria Karlsdottir
Hanna Maria Karlsdottir
Hanna Maria Karlsdottir